Nothopegia beddomei is a species of plant in the family Anacardiaceae. It is found in India and Sri Lanka. It is threatened by habitat loss.

Culture
Known as "bala" (බල) in Sinhala.

References

External links

Flora of India (region)
Flora of Sri Lanka
beddomei